Richard Alfred Tapia (born March 25, 1938) is an American mathematician and University Professor at Rice University in Houston, Texas, the university's highest academic title.  In 2011, President Obama awarded Tapia the National Medal of Science. He is currently the Maxfield and Oshman Professor of Engineering; Associate Director of Graduate Studies, Office of Research and Graduate Studies; and Director of the Center for Excellence and Equity in Education at Rice University.

Tapia's mathematical research is focused on mathematical optimization and iterative methods for nonlinear problems.  His current research is in the area of algorithms for constrained optimization and interior point methods for linear and nonlinear programming.

Biography
Tapia was born in Santa Monica, California to parents, Amado and Magda, who both emigrated to the United States from Mexico. His father worked for Japanese American horticulturists in southern California.

Education 
He received his B.A. in mathematics from the  University of California, Los Angeles, in 1961.

He then earned his M.A. in mathematics, also from the University of California, Los Angeles, in 1966.

He received his Ph.D. from  University of California, Los Angeles, 1967 in mathematics with the dissertation: "A Generalization of Newton's Method with an Application to the Euler–Lagrange Equation" under the advisors: Magnus Hestenes, Charles Tompkins

Tapia also holds honorary doctorates from Carnegie Mellon University and the Colorado School of Mines.

Career 
In 2004, he received the Society for Industrial and Applied Mathematics (SIAM) Prize for Distinguished Service to the Profession, in Portland, and Distinguished Public Service Award, American Mathematical Society, in Phoenix.

In 2009, he received Hispanic Heritage Award in Math and Science and he was chosen to have a "Celebration of Diversity in Computing" [conference] named after him (usually held annually or biennially).

In 2014, the Blackwell-Tapia prize and conference were named for Tapia and David Blackwell. 

In 2021, he received the award Fellow of the American Mathematical Society.

See also 
 Army Mathematics Research Center at. the University of Wisconsin–Madison
 Baylor College of Medicine
 National Science Foundation
 National Science Board by President Clinton
 National Academy of Engineering
 SACNAS Scientist Award, Society for the Advancement of Hispanics/Chicanos and Native Americans in Science
 T.I.R.R., (then called the Texas Institute for Rehabilitation and Research) Baylor College of Medicine
 Vannevar Bush Award

References 

 
 "Tapia Video Biography", The Department of Computational and Applied Mathematics at Rice University.
 
 
 "Tapia promoted to University Professor", Rice University News Release.

1939 births
Living people
American academics of Mexican descent
20th-century American mathematicians
21st-century American mathematicians
Fellows of the American Mathematical Society
Fellows of the Society for Industrial and Applied Mathematics
Members of the United States National Academy of Engineering
National Medal of Science laureates
Rice University faculty
University of California, Los Angeles alumni